Elena Martín Gimeno (born 1992) is a Spanish actress and filmmaker from Catalonia.

Biography 
Born in Barcelona in 1992, Elena Martín Gimeno earned a degree in Audiovisual Communication from the Pompeu Fabra University. She starred as Àgata in the 2016 film , and made her feature film directorial with the 2017 drama Júlia ist, which she also co-wrote and starred. For this work, she won the Best Director Award at the Málaga Film Festival's Zonacine section. She later directed episodes of the season 1 of Perfect Life, an episode of the anthology series En casa and collaborated in the writing of Veneno (in which she also featured in a cameo). She also entered development of Creatura, her intended second feature.

Filmography (actress)

References 

Living people
1992 births
Actresses from Barcelona
Pompeu Fabra University alumni
Film directors from Catalonia
Spanish women film directors
Film actresses from Catalonia
Spanish women screenwriters
21st-century Spanish screenwriters
21st-century Spanish actresses